Tehzeeb may refer to
Tehzeeb (1971 film) from Pakistan
Tehzeeb (2003 film), 2003  Bollywood film directed by Khalid Mohammed.
 Ganga-Jamuni tehzeeb
 Tehzeeb-ul-Ikhlaq (1871-1897), a journal published by the Muslim reformer Sir Syed Ahmed Khan.